Charles Holland Duell (April 13, 1850 – January 29, 1920) was the Commissioner of the United States Patent Office from 1898 to 1901, and was later an associate judge of the Court of Appeals of the District of Columbia.

Education and career

Born on April 13, 1850, in Cortland, New York, Duell received an Artium Baccalaureus degree in 1871 from Hamilton College and graduated from Hamilton College Law School in 1872. He entered private practice in New York City, New York from 1873 to 1880. He was a member of the New York State Assembly in 1878 and 1880. He returned to private practice in Syracuse, New York from 1880 to 1898. He was the United States Commissioner of Patents of the United States Patent Office (now the United States Patent and Trademark Office) from 1898 to 1901. He resumed private practice in New York City from 1901 to 1904. He was a presidential elector in 1908.

Federal judicial service

Duell was nominated by President Theodore Roosevelt on December 16, 1904, to an Associate Justice seat on the Court of Appeals of the District of Columbia (now the United States Court of Appeals for the District of Columbia Circuit) vacated by Associate Justice Seth Shepard. He was confirmed by the United States Senate on January 5, 1905, and received his commission the same day. His service terminated on August 31, 1906, due to his resignation.

Later career and death

Following his resignation from the federal bench, Duell resumed private practice in New York City from 1906 to 1913, and in 1915. He died on January 29, 1920, in Yonkers, New York.

Personal

Duell was the son of Congressman R. Holland Duell (1824–1891) and Mary L. (Cuyler) Duell (1822–1884). He married Harriet M. Sackett (born 1854), and they had several children, among them State Senator Holland S. Duell (1881–1942).

Everything that can be invented has been invented

Duell has become famous for, during his tenure as United States Commissioner of Patents, purportedly saying "Everything that can be invented has been invented." However, this has been debunked as apocryphal by librarian Samuel Sass who traced the quote back to a 1981 book titled "The Book of Facts and Fallacies" by Chris Morgan and David Langford. In fact, Duell said in 1902: 

Dennis Crouch saw a correlation between the expression and a joke from an 1899 edition of Punch magazine.
In that edition, the comedy magazine offered a look at the "coming century." In colloquy, a genius asked "isn't there a clerk who can examine patents?" A boy replied "Quite unnecessary, Sir. Everything that can be invented has been invented."

Another possible origin of this famous statement may actually be found in a report to Congress in 1843 by an earlier Patent Office Commissioner, Henry Ellsworth. In it Ellsworth states, "The advancement of the arts, from year to year, taxes our credulity and seems to presage the arrival of that period when human improvement must end." This quote was apparently then mispresented and attributed to Duell, who held the same office in 1899.

References

Sources
 
 Sackett family

External links
 

Patent examiners
1850 births
1920 deaths
People from Cortland, New York
Hamilton College (New York) alumni
United States Commissioners of Patents
Judges of the United States Court of Appeals for the D.C. Circuit
United States federal judges appointed by Theodore Roosevelt
1908 United States presidential electors